Mike Hager (born November 5, 1962) is an American politician. He served as a Republican member of the North Carolina House of Representatives until August 2016 when he unexpectedly resigned to care for his parents. He represented the 112th district and had served as majority leader since January 2015. Mike Hager now serves on the Rutherford County School Board.

Committee assignments

2015-2016 session
Public Utilities (Vice Chair)
Finance (Vice Chair)
Commerce and Job Development
Environment
Judiciary IV
Regulatory Reform

2013-2014 session
Appropriations
Public Utilities (Chair)
Environment (Vice Chair)
Finance
Commerce and Job Development
Banking

2011-2012 session
Appropriations
Public Utilities (Vice Chair)
Banking
Commerce and Job Development
Education
Government

Electoral history

2014

2012

2010

2004

References

External links

|-

Living people
Republican Party members of the North Carolina House of Representatives
1962 births
21st-century American politicians